The Northwest Staging Route was a series of airstrips, airport and radio ranging stations built in Alberta, British Columbia, Yukon and Alaska during World War II. It extended into the Soviet Union as the ALSIB (ALaska-SIBerian air road).

Origins
The route was developed in 1942 for several reasons. Initially, the 7th Ferrying Group, Ferrying Command, United States Army Air Corps (later Air Transport Command) at Gore Field (Great Falls Municipal Airport) was ordered to organize and develop an air route to send assistance to the Soviet Union through Northern Canada, across Alaska and the Bering Sea to Siberia, and eventually over to the Eastern Front. The US-Canadian Permanent Joint Board on Defense decided in the autumn of 1940 that a string of airports should be constructed at Canadian expense between the city of Edmonton in central Alberta and the Alaska-Yukon border. Late in 1941 the Canadian government reported that rough landing fields had been completed.

With the outbreak of war, American lines of communication with Alaska by sea were seriously threatened and alternative routes had to be opened. The string of airports through the lonely tundra and forests of northwest Canada provided an air route to Alaska which was practically invulnerable to attack, and it seemed to be in U.S. interests to develop them and open a highway which would at once be a service road for the airports and a means for transporting essential supplies to the Alaskan outposts. In response, the United States Army began building the Alaskan Highway.

Neither the Eleventh Air Force, nor the United States Army, nor the Lend-Lease aid to the Soviet Union could wait for the Alaska Highway to be completed. The long route through the Caribbean to Brazil, Nigeria, Egypt and Iran was unworkable, nor could aircraft be flown via Greenland or Iceland. A huge program of airport construction and road making, therefore, was undertaken.

The Alaska Highway was but a part of the defenses provided for the Northwest North American frontier. Much less is known about the great air route leading from the United States to Alaska through Canada. Airfields were built or upgraded every  or so from Edmonton, Alberta to Fairbanks, Alaska ("the longest hop being the 140 miles or so between Fort Nelson and the Liard River flight strip") The route of the Alaska Highway, which was built to provide a land route to Alaska, basically connected the airfields together. Edmonton became the headquarters of the Alaskan Wing, Air Transport Command.

Two routes were developed from the United States, which met at Edmonton, Alberta, from which the aircraft were ferried to Ladd Field, near Fairbanks, Alaska where the American-built aircraft were to be turned over to Russian flight crews. Marks Army Airfield, near Nome, Alaska was 500 miles closer to Russia, but was ruled out because the United States feared it was too vulnerable to Japanese attack. One route originated at Great Falls Army Air Base, Montana, where aircraft bound for Russia were ferried from their manufacturing plants in Southern California.

The other route originated at Minneapolis, Minnesota, where Wold-Chamberlain Airport was used as an aircraft staging point for aircraft manufactured in the Midwest and northeastern United States. The Minneapolis-Edmonton route, however was turned into a transport route only by the end of 1943, with aircraft ferrying operations being shifted to Great Falls. In addition to the Lend-Lease aircraft, Alaskan Eleventh Air Force aircraft were also ferried up the NSR, with the aircraft being flown to Elmendorf Field, near Anchorage from RCAF Station Whitehorse upon their arrival.

Aircraft 

Three main types of combat aircraft were ferried to the Soviet Union under Lend-Lease. Fighter aircraft were Bell P-39 Airacobras, and later its successor, the Bell P-63 Kingcobra, which were favored by the Red Air Force who used the two types with great success. The majority of the P-39s shipped to the Soviet Union were the definitive Q-models. Bombers included the Douglas A-20 Havoc light attack bomber and North American B-25 Mitchell medium bombers that were also sent to the Red Air Force. Transport aircraft were made up of predominantly, the Douglas C-47 Skytrain, also supplied in great numbers.

The Bell fighters and the B-25 Mitchells were flown up to Ladd via Minneapolis; the C-47s and A-20s came up via Great Falls. A handful of other aircraft types, North American AT-6 Texan trainers, some North American Curtiss P-40 Warhawk fighters, three Republic P-47 Thunderbolts and one Curtiss C-46 Commando transport were also ferried to Russia. The aircraft were supplied with Russian language operations and maintenance manuals, as well as painted in Red Air Force camouflage colors and national markings.

The Russians set up a command at Ladd Field and Nome where their pilots were trained to take over the aircraft and fly them to Krasnoyarsk in Siberia and on to various fronts in western Russia. The first group of Russian pilots arrived at Nome on 14 August 1942 on their way to Ladd Field. Along with the pilots were civilians from the Soviet Purchasing Commission and a group of Red Air Force mechanics. Most were located at Ladd, with a secondary group at Marks Field. The first Lend-Lease aircraft, a group of twelve A-20 Havocs, arrived at Ladd on 3 September 1942. The first Russian pilots, after five days of training on the aircraft, took off for Nome and the long trip to the Eastern Front.

Initially the USAAF provided the initial training on how to operate and maintain the Lend-Lease aircraft. Later, after an experienced cadre was developed, the Russians assumed the responsibility. The Russians also meticulously inspected each aircraft, and would reject any aircraft that presented the slightest problem. The USAAF was then left with the chore of correcting them. It was sometimes quite exasperating, as the USAAF would work long hours of overtime to get the aircraft into first-class condition so that all the Russians had to do was fly them from Fairbanks to the Eastern Front.

Other uses 
The ALSIB and Northwest Staging Route also provided a diplomatic route between Washington, D.C. and Moscow. Diplomats, high political figures and countless other government officials shuttled back and forth along it in transports during the war. Wendell Willkie, Vice-President Henry A. Wallace, Soviet Foreign Minister Vyacheslav Molotov, and Andrei Gromyko were but a few who used the route. President Roosevelt considered holding a summit in Fairbanks in 1944 to meet with Stalin, however the location was subsequently changed to Yalta in the Soviet Union. Also the route provided a means over which the Russians moved intelligence agents and classified information obtained illegally in the United States. The Soviets, claiming diplomatic immunity, routinely moved large numbers of suitcases in batches of 50 or more, their contents diplomatically sealed.

The Russians who arrived in Alaska also frequently visited shopping areas in Fairbanks and Nome, and contingents visited the aircraft manufacturing plants in the United States. They maintained a strict decorum and politely paid for their purchases, sometimes in old US gold certificates. Many luxury items were bought and shipped back to the Soviet Union on the Lend-Lease aircraft with the hope that they would reach their final destinations in Russia. Most of the Russian pilots were experienced combat veterans who saw the ferrying mission as a respite from their combat missions. They were generally reserved, and political officers were sent to Alaska to ensure their loyalty.

Termination
As the Pacific War wound down, the wartime marriage of convenience between the capitalistic and communist countries was coming to an end. In 1945, the United States and Soviet Union were about to embark on a Cold War and the Russians departed Fairbanks shortly after the Japanese capitulation in September 1945.

Possibly because of their strict inspection standards, there were remarkably few aircraft accidents. During the 21 months of the program, 7,983 aircraft were delivered to the Russians with only 133 lost to weather or pilot error. Thirteen Red Air Force pilots were buried in the Fort Richardson cemetery.

Airfields
Primary airfields in BOLD

See also

 North Atlantic air ferry route in World War II
 South Atlantic air ferry route in World War II
 South Pacific air ferry route in World War II
 West Coast Wing (Air Transport Command route to Alaska)
 Crimson Route

References
Notes

Bibliography

 Carter, John D. "The Air Transport Command, The Army Air Forces in World War II, vol. 7" in Craven, Wesley Frank and James Lea Cate, eds. Services Around the World. Washington, D.C.: Office of Air Force History, 1983.
 Chloe, John Hale. Top Cover for America: The Air Force in Alaska, 1920-1983. Missoula, Montana: Pictorial Histories Publishing Company, 1984. .
 Cohen, Stan B. The Forgotten War: A Pictorial History of World War II in Alaska and Northwestern Canada, Volume 1. Missoula, Montana: Pictorial Histories Publishing Co., Inc., 1981. .
 Cohen, Stan B. The Forgotten War: A Pictorial History of World War II in Alaska and Northwestern Canada, Volume 2. Missoula, Montana: Pictorial Histories Publishing Co., Inc., 1989. .
 Cohen, Stan B. The Forgotten War: A Pictorial History of World War II in Alaska and Northwestern Canada, Volume 3. Missoula, Montana: Pictorial Histories Publishing Co., Inc., 1992. .
 Conn, Stetson and Byron Fairchild. "The United States and Canada: Elements of Wartime Collaboration, The Western Hemisphere - The Framework of Hemisphere Defense, Chapter XV." United States Army in World War II. Washington, D.C.: United States Army Center of Military History, 1989.
 Hays, Otis Jr. The Alaska-Siberia Connection: The World War II Air Route (Williams-Ford Texas A&M University Military History Series). College Station, Texas: Tamu Press, 1996. .
 Mueller, Robert. Air Force Bases Volume I, Active Air Force Bases Within the United States of America on 17 September 1982. Washington, D.C.: Office of Air Force History, 1989.
 Smith, Blake. Warplanes to Alaska. Surrey, British Columbia: Hancock House Pub Ltd., 1998. .
 Smith, Blake. Wings Over the Wilderness: They Flew the Trail of '42. Surrey, British Columbia: Hancock House Pub Ltd., 2008. .

External links

Yukon Archives page
Allies and Lend-Lease Museum'', Moscow

Aircraft ferrying
Military history of Canada during World War II
Soviet Union–United States relations
Canada–Soviet Union relations
Transport in British Columbia
Transport in Yukon
Aviation in Alaska